Loreto Municipality is a municipality of the Marbán Province in the Beni Department in Bolivia. Its seat is Loreto.

See also 
 Isiboro Sécure National Park and Indigenous Territory

References 

 Instituto Nacional de Estadistica de Bolivia

Municipalities of Beni Department